Live at the Isle of Wight Festival 1970 is an album by British progressive rock band Emerson, Lake & Palmer, recorded at the Isle of Wight Festival in 1970 and released on CD in 1997. At this concert ELP played "Pictures at an Exhibition".

Track listing 
 "The Barbarian" (5:07)
 "Take a Pebble" (11:47)
 "Pictures at an Exhibition" (34:30)
 "Promenade" (1:38)
 "The Gnome" (3:46)
 "Promenade - The Sage" (5:32)
 "The Old Castle - Blues Variation" (8:35)
 "Promenade" (1:26)
 "Baba Yaga" (7:33)
 "The Great Gates of Kiev" (7:20)
 "Rondo" (6:12)
 "Nut Rocker" (4:49)
 "Interview" (8:16)

Personnel
Keith Emerson - Hammond organ, piano, Moog synthesizer
Greg Lake - bass guitar, acoustic guitar, vocals
Carl Palmer - drums, percussion

Production
Producer: Emerson, Lake & Palmer
Engineer: Stephen Baker
Mastering: Jeff Gilhart
Artwork: Alan Ticheler
Liner Notes: Bruce Plato

References

Albums produced by Keith Emerson
Albums produced by Greg Lake
Albums produced by Carl Palmer
Emerson, Lake & Palmer live albums
1997 live albums
Isle of Wight Festival